In mathematical finite group theory, the concept of regular p-group captures some of the more important properties of abelian p-groups, but is general enough to include most "small" p-groups.

Definition
A finite p-group G is said to be regular if any of the following equivalent ,  conditions are satisfied:
 For every a, b in G, there is a c in the derived subgroup H′ of the subgroup H of G generated by a and b, such that ap · bp = (ab)p · cp.
 For every a, b in G, there are elements ci in the derived subgroup of the subgroup generated by a and b, such that ap · bp = (ab)p · c1p ⋯ ckp.
 For every a, b in G and every positive integer n, there are elements ci in the derived subgroup of the subgroup generated by a and b such that aq · bq = (ab)q · c1q ⋯ ckq, where q = pn.

Examples
Many familiar p-groups are regular:
 Every abelian p-group is regular.
 Every p-group of nilpotency class strictly less than p is regular. This follows from the Hall–Petresco identity.
 Every p-group of order at most pp is regular.
 Every finite group of exponent p is regular.

However, many familiar p-groups are not regular:
 Every nonabelian 2-group is irregular.
 The Sylow p-subgroup of the symmetric group on p2 points is irregular and of order pp+1.

Properties

A p-group is regular if and only if every subgroup generated by two elements is regular.

Every subgroup and quotient group of a regular group is regular, but the direct product of regular groups need not be regular.

A 2-group is regular if and only if it is abelian.  A 3-group with two generators is regular if and only if its derived subgroup is cyclic.  Every p-group of odd order with cyclic derived subgroup is regular.

The subgroup of a p-group G generated by the elements of order dividing pk is denoted Ωk(G) and regular groups are well-behaved in that Ωk(G) is precisely the set of elements of order dividing pk. The subgroup generated by all pk-th powers of elements in G is denoted ℧k(G).  In a regular group, the index [G:℧k(G)] is equal to the order of Ωk(G).  In fact, commutators and powers interact in particularly simple ways .  For example, given normal subgroups M and N of a regular p-group G and nonnegative integers m and n, one has [℧m(M),℧n(N)] = ℧m+n([M,N]).
 Philip Hall's criteria of regularity of a p-group G: G is regular, if one of the following hold:
 [G:℧1(G)] < pp
 [G′:℧1(G′)| < pp−1
 |Ω1(G)| < pp−1

Generalizations

 Powerful p-group
 power closed p-group

References

Properties of groups
Finite groups
P-groups